Ivan Asenov Andonov (3 May 1934 – 29 December 2011) was a Bulgarian film director and actor. He directed more than thirty films, and is best known for his cinematography on Ladies' Choice (1980), Dangerous Charm (1984), Yesterday (1988) and Rio Adio (1989).

Selected filmography

As filmmaker

As actor

References

External links
 

1934 births
2011 deaths
People from Plovdiv
Film people from Plovdiv
Actors from Plovdiv
Bulgarian male film actors
Bulgarian male stage actors
Bulgarian male television actors
Bulgarian film directors
Bulgarian screenwriters
Male screenwriters